The rusty-fronted barwing (Actinodura egertoni) is a species of bird in the laughingthrush family, Leiothrichidae.

It is found in Southeast Asia from the Himalayas to north-eastern Myanmar. Its natural habitats are temperate forests and subtropical or tropical moist montane forests.

Gallery

References

Collar, N. J. & Robson C. 2007. Family Timaliidae (Babblers)  pp. 70 – 291 in; del Hoyo, J., Elliott, A. & Christie, D.A. eds. Handbook of the Birds of the World, Vol. 12. Picathartes to Tits and Chickadees. Lynx Edicions, Barcelona.

rusty-fronted barwing
Birds of Nepal
Birds of Bhutan
Birds of Northeast India
Birds of Myanmar
rusty-fronted barwing
Taxonomy articles created by Polbot